The Minister of Education is the head of the Ministry of Education and one of the cabinet ministers of the Government of Bangladesh. Current education minister is Dipu Moni.

List of ministers

References

Education ministers of Bangladesh
Bangladesh